This was the first edition of the tournament.

Oscar Otte won the title after defeating Taro Daniel 4–6, 6–1, 6–3 in the final.

Seeds

Draw

Finals

Top half

Bottom half

References
Main Draw
Qualifying Draw

Lisboa Belém Open - Singles
2017 Singles
2017 Lisboa Belém Open